American Blue Note is a 1989 drama film directed by Ralph Toporoff, who wrote the screenplay with Gilbert Girion. It stars Peter MacNicol, Carl Capotorto, Tim Guinee, Jonathan Walker, Bill Christopher-Myers, and Eddie Jones. Filmed in 1989, the independently produced film didn't get a distributor until 1991.

Premise
The film follows a group of jazz musicians in the 1960s who play in small clubs and face constant financial hardships. Of the group, only one of them will go on to achieve success.

Principal cast

References

External links 

1989 films
1989 crime drama films
American independent films
Jazz films
American drama films
1989 independent films
1989 directorial debut films
1980s English-language films
1980s American films